Markaz is a village in Batken Region of Kyrgyzstan. It is part of the Kadamjay District. Its population was 7,860 in 2021.

Population

References

Populated places in Batken Region